The 1913–14 NCAA men's basketball season began in December 1913, progressed through the regular season, and concluded in March 1914.

Rule changes

Baskets with open bottoms that allow the ball to fall through become mandatory. Previously, baskets had closed bottoms, requiring the pulling of a rope to release the ball after a field goal or successful free throw. The switch to open-bottomed baskets increased the tempo of play and scoring.

Season headlines 

 In February 1943, the Helms Athletic Foundation retroactively selected Wisconsin as its national champion for the 1913–14 season.
 In 1995, the Premo-Porretta Power Poll retroactively selected Wisconsin as its national champion for the 1913–14 season.

Regular season

Conference winners

Statistical leaders

Awards

Helms College Basketball All-Americans 

The practice of selecting a Consensus All-American Team did not begin until the 1928–29 season. The Helms Athletic Foundation later retroactively selected a list of All-Americans for the 1913–14 season.

Major player of the year awards 

 Helms Player of the Year: Gil Halstead, Cornell (retroactive selection in 1944)

Coaching changes 

A number of teams changed coaches during the season and after it ended.

References